DYYD (106.3 FM), on-air as 106.3 Yes The Best, is a radio station owned and operated by Manila Broadcasting Company through its licensee Cebu Broadcasting Company. Its studios and transmitter facilities are located at the 2nd floor, Sesyl Arcade, Hotel Palwa, Locsin St., Dumaguete. This station operates 24/7.

History
DYYD was established in 1992 as Love Radio under the call letters DYMY. At that time, the station aired an easy listening format. In 1998, the station was rebranded as 106.3 Yes FM and switched to a mass-based format. In 2000s, the station's callsign was changed to DYYD.

References

Radio stations in Dumaguete
Radio stations established in 1992